In Bordeaux, the Cognitique Institute (IdC) was a public education institution, founded in 2003 by the Bordeaux Segalen University, that includes a cognitive engineering training program (master in engineering), two Masters programs and a PhD program in applied cognitive science.
Since 2009, IdC joined the Polytechnic Institute of Bordeaux (IPB) and its name change to become : Ecole Nationale Superieure de Cognitique (ENSC).
Pr. Bernard Claverie was Founder and Director of the Bordeaux Cognitique Institute (2003-2009) and of the ENSC (2009-2019).

University of Bordeaux
Educational institutions established in 2003
2003 establishments in France